State Route 201 (SR 201) is a  state highway in Pike County, Alabama, United States, that serves as an eastern bypass around the town of Banks.

Route description
The southern terminus of SR 201 is located at its intersection with SR 93 southeast of Banks. From this point, the route travels in a northerly direction before reaching its northern terminus at US 29 east of Banks.

Major intersections

See also

References

External links

201
Transportation in Pike County, Alabama